Mattias Mete (born 30 May 1987) is a Swedish footballer who plays for Södertälje FK as a forward.

References

External links
 
 
 
 

1988 births
Living people
Association football forwards
Syrianska FC players
Västerås SK Fotboll players
Åtvidabergs FF players
Allsvenskan players
Superettan players
Swedish footballers
Dalkurd FF players
Husqvarna FF players
Syrianska IF Kerburan players
Södertälje FK players